Stephen Brent Slick is a former Central Intelligence Agency (CIA) operations officer and United States National Security Council official.  He is the inaugural director of the Intelligence Studies Project at the University of Texas at Austin, where he is also a Clinical Professor at the Lyndon B. Johnson School of Public Affairs and the Bobby R. Inman Chair in Intelligence Studies. 

During his career in the CIA's Clandestine Service, he completed five overseas tours, including two as chief of station and senior intelligence community representative. He also played key roles in developing the provisions of the Intelligence Reform and Terrorism Prevention Act of 2004 and amendments to Executive Order 12333, issued by President Bush in 2008.

Education and early career 
Slick holds a Bachelor of Arts degree (B.A.) (with high honors) in political science from the Pennsylvania State University, where he was elected to Phi Beta Kappa.  He earned a Juris Doctor (J.D.) from the UCLA School of Law, where he was a member of Law Review.  He also received a Master's Degree in Public Policy from Princeton University’s Woodrow Wilson School of Public and International Affairs while studying on a John L. Weinberg fellowship.

From 1983–1986, Slick was a litigation associate at the Rawle and Henderson law firm in Philadelphia, Pennsylvania.

Slick joined the CIA in 1986. After completing basic espionage tradecraft and foreign language training, Slick was assigned under official cover overseas as an operations officer in Eastern Europe, South Asia, and as Deputy Chief of Station in Eurasia.  From 1996–1998, he was assigned to CIA Headquarters, where he directed the CIA's training and tradecraft development for operations in complex security and counterintelligence environments.

Slick was awarded CIA's Commendation Medal, Medal of Merit, and the National Intelligence Superior Service Medal, and other awards from the CIA, the Department of State, and foreign governments. In 2018, he was recognized as Penn State's Outstanding Political Science Alumnus by the Department's Board of Visitors.

Career 
After serving as Chief of Station in Budapest, Hungary from 1998–2000, Slick returned to Langley to lead the CIA's Balkan Operations. He then became an Executive Assistant to Deputy Director of Central Intelligence John McLaughlin.  In 2004, he moved to the National Security Council (NSC) as Director for Intelligence Programs. In 2005, Slick was appointed Special Assistant to the President and NSC Senior Director for Intelligence Programs and Reform. In this latter position, he was an advisor on intelligence matters to the President and the assistants to the President for national security affairs, homeland security, and counterterrorism.

At the NSC, Slick chaired the Policy Coordination Committee on Intelligence Programs, leading administrative and interagency reviews of ongoing and proposed covert action programs and sensitive intelligence collection activities.
Slick was part of a team led by NSC Counsel John Bellinger and Senior Director for Intelligence Programs David Shedd that supported the development of an administration response to recommendations for government reform put forward by the 9/11 Commission. The team also lobbied for what would ultimately be enacted as the Intelligence Reform and Terrorism Prevention Act of 2004 (IRTPA).  Slick led an NSC staff review of recommendations by the Silberman-Robb Commission regarding intelligence failures in connection with pre-war assessments of Iraq's weapons of mass destruction.  During his White House assignment, Slick advocated for strong central leadership of the Intelligence Community while preserving the CIA's traditional roles in human intelligence, coordinating intelligence activities overseas, and conducting covert action directed by the President and supervised by the NSC.

During President Bush's second term, Slick supported calls by Director of National Intelligence Mike McConnell and the President's Intelligence Advisory Board to revise Executive Order 12333. The Order, originally issued by President Ronald Reagan in 1981, served as the “charter” for U.S. intelligence. Many of its terms became obsolete on passage of the IRTPA.  Slick led the year-long process of interagency coordination of a revised Executive Order 12333, which President Bush signed in July 2008.

After assisting with the transition of intelligence activities to the Obama administration, Slick returned to the CIA in early 2009.  He was given a four-year assignment as Chief of Station and the Director of National Intelligence's Representative in a Middle Eastern capital.  He retired from federal service in 2014.

In January 2015, Slick was named the first Director of the Intelligence Studies Project, sponsored jointly by the Robert S. Strauss Center for International Security and Law and the Clements Center for National Security at the University of Texas at Austin.  He was appointed as a Clinical Professor at the University's Lyndon B. Johnson School of Public Affairs at the same time. Slick is Fellow to the Bobby R. Inman Chair in Intelligence Studies.

In August 2016, Slick was among 50 senior Republican national security officials who signed a letter declaring that Donald Trump “lacks the character, values and experience” to be president and “would put at risk our country’s national security and well-being.”  He also joined the larger group of Former Republican National Security Officials in an August 2020 statement declaring President Trump “dangerously unfit” and lacking the “character and competence” to hold the office.  The same group expressed confidence that Joe Biden would “restore the dignity of the presidency” and “reassert America’s role as a global leader.”

In 2020, Slick, along with over 130 other former Republican national security officials, signed a statement that asserted that President Trump was unfit to serve another term, and "To that end, we are firmly convinced that it is in the best interest of our nation that Vice President Joe Biden be elected as the next President of the United States, and we will vote for him."

External links
"From a Former CIA Officer's Perspective: On a Path Toward Intelligence Integration," by Stephen B. Slick in Studies in Intelligence, September 2021
"This November, America's Safety Is on the Ballot," by Stephen Slick in Foreign Policy, October 9, 2020
"Support for U.S. Intelligence Continues, Despite Presidential Attacks and Concerns Over Transparency," by Stephen Slick and Josh Busby in Lawfare, September 21, 2020
"Trust and Distrust in the American Political System," Panel discussion with Joan Dempsey, David Rohde, and Stephen Slick at the Council on Foreign Relations, September 16, 2020
"Intelligence with a Human Face (featuring Stephen Slick)," Podcast episode with The Slavic Connexion, June 1, 2020
"Revisiting Legacy Restrictions on the Intelligence Community's Handling of SIGINT Data on Non-Americans," by Eric Manpearl and Steve Slick in Lawfare, October 17, 2019
"Public Attitudes on US Intelligence: Annual Poll Reflects Bipartisan Confidence Despite Presidential Antagonism," by Stephen Slick, Joshua Busby, and Kingsley Burns in The Chicago Council of Global Affairs, July 8, 2019
"Horns of a Dilemma Podcast: Seeing Beyond the Horizon with PD/DNI Sue Gordon," by Susan Gordan and Stephen Slick in War on the Rocks, April 25, 2019
"Horns of a Dilemma Podcast on SSCI’s Investigation into Russian Active Measures," by Richard Burr, John Cornyn, Mark Warner, Gregory Fenves, and Stephen Slick in War on the Rocks, December 28, 2018
"Restoring U.S. Intelligence After the Trump Presidency," by Steve Slick in Lawfare, December 17, 2018
"U.S. Intelligence Should Embrace Sasse's Cyber Solarium Commission," by Steve Slick in War On The Rocks, August 16, 2018
Book Review: "Quis Custodiet Ipsos Custodes," by Steve Slick in Lawfare, August 9, 2018
"Glasnost for US Intelligence: Will Transparency Lead to Increased Public Trust," by Stephen Slick and Josh Busby in The Chicago Council of Global Affairs, May 24, 2018
Book Review: "A Lost Opportunity to Learn Lessons from the Cultural Cold War" by Steve Slick in Lawfare, September 26, 2017
"Intelligence Studies Essay: 'After you, Alphonse,' or Why Two Different Intelligence Agencies Now Attend National Security Council Meetings, Whether It Matters, and How to Mitigate the Potential Hazards" by Steve Slick in Lawfare, July 27, 2017
"The Intelligence Community Faces Sharp Challenges, but No Crisis," by Stephen Slick in Foreign Policy, January 11, 2017
"From Now On, Let’s Hold Intelligence Briefings After the Election," by Stephen Slick in Foreign Policy/Shadow Government, November 4, 2016
Book Review: "A Costly Pause in a Troubled Relationship," by Steve Slick in Lawfare, October 31, 2016
"Slick and Inboden: U.S. Must Streamline Intelligence Processes," by Stephen Slick and William Inboden in The Dallas Morning News, June 30, 2016
"Intelligence Planks for a Sturdy National Security Platform," by Steve Slick in Lawfare, June 28, 2016
"Intelligence and National Security in American Society," LBJ School of Public Affairs Policy Research Project Report 189, May 2016. Project directed by Stephen Slick and William Inboden. 
"Measuring Change at the CIA," by Stephen Slick in Foreign Policy, May 4, 2016
"Comment on Presidential Intelligence," by Stephen B. Slick in Harvard Law Review, January 11, 2016
"Congress: Resist the Temptation to Legislate on the CTIIC," by Steve Slick in Lawfare, August 25, 2015
"The Office of the DNI’s Greatest Hits," by Stephen Slick and Michael Allen in Foreign Policy/Shadow Government, April 21, 2015
"Intelligence Studies Essay: CTIIC – - Learning From the Choices and Challenges that Shaped the National Counterterrorism Center," by Steve Slick in Lawfare, March 4, 2015
"The 2008 Amendments to Executive Order 12333, United States Intelligence Activities," by Stephen B. Slick, July 17, 2014

References

Living people
Year of birth missing (living people)
United States National Security Council staffers
People of the Central Intelligence Agency
University of Texas at Austin people
Princeton School of Public and International Affairs alumni
Pennsylvania State University alumni
UCLA School of Law alumni